Leonhard Fredrik Rääf (1786 – 1872) also known as Ydredrotten was a Swedish folklorist, local historian and conservative politician from Ydre. During a time Rääf had a literary salon in Tomestorp which was frequented by among others Per Daniel Amadeus Atterbom. In 1843 Rääf moved to a farm in Forsnäs where he lived until his death in 1872.

Rääf is buried together with some possessions in a Viking-style mound at the shores of Lägern.

References

1786 births
1872 deaths
Swedish archivists
People from Kinda Municipality,
19th-century Swedish historians
Uppsala University alumni